House of Berislavić may refer to various Croatian noble families:

Berislavići Grabarski
Berislavići Trogirski 
Berislavići Malomlački